Instrumentation and control engineering (ICE) is a branch of engineering that studies the measurement and control of process variables, and the design and implementation of systems that incorporate them. Process variables include pressure, temperature, humidity, flow, pH, force and speed. 

ICE combines two branches of engineering. Instrumentation engineering is the science of the measurement and control of process variables within a production or manufacturing area. Meanwhile, control engineering, also called control systems engineering, is the engineering discipline that applies control theory to design systems with desired behaviors. 

Control engineers are responsible for the research, design, and development of control devices and systems, typically in manufacturing facilities and process plants. Control methods employ sensors to measure the output variable of the device and provide feedback to the controller so that it can make corrections toward desired performance. Automatic control manages a device without the need of human inputs for correction, such as cruise control for regulating a car's speed. 

Control systems engineering activities are multi-disciplinary in nature. They focus on the implementation of control systems, mainly derived by mathematical modeling. Because instrumentation and control play a significant role in gathering information from a system and changing its parameters, they are a key part of control loops.

As profession 
High demand for engineering professionals is found in fields associated with process automation. Specializations include industrial instrumentation, system dynamics, process control, and control systems. Additionally, technological knowledge, particularly in computer systems, is essential to the job of an instrumentation and control engineer; important technology-related topics include human–computer interaction, programmable logic controllers, and SCADA. The tasks center around designing, developing, maintaining and managing control systems.

The goals of the work of an instrumentation and control engineer are to maximize:
 Productivity 
 Optimization 
 Stability
 Reliability 
 Safety
 Continuity

As academic discipline 

Many universities teach instrumentation and control engineering as an academic courses at the graduate and postgraduate levels. It is possible to approach this field coming from many standard engineering backgrounds, being the most common among them Electrical and Mechanical Engineering, since these branches cover strong foundational subjects in control systems, system dynamics, electro-mechanical machines and devices, as well as electric circuits.

See also
 Industrial system
 Instrumentation in petrochemical industries
 List of sensors
 Metrology
 Measurement
 Programmable logic controller
 International Society of Automation

References

External links 
 Industrial Instrumentation and Controls Technology Alliance
 Instrumentation and Control

Process engineering
Sensors
Measuring instruments